David Gerard Simmons  (born 6 October 1955) is a New Zealand lecturer in tourism policy. During his university years, he was a rowing cox, winning bronze medals at two world rowing championships.

Biography
Simmons was born in 1955 in Christchurch. He was the cox for the eight in the 1975 World Rowing Championships in Nottingham, Great Britain, and won a bronze medal. He represented New Zealand at the 1976 Summer Olympics. He is listed as New Zealand Olympian athlete number 375 by the New Zealand Olympic Committee.

Simmons gained a Bachelor of Science and then a Master of Applied Science from the University of Canterbury. He wrote his PhD at the University of Waterloo in Canada. Since 1980, he has lectured in tourism policy at Lincoln University, where he is now an emeritus professor.

In the 2023 New Year Honours, Simmons was appointed a Companion of the New Zealand Order of Merit (CNZM), for services to tourism and tertiary education.

References

1955 births
Living people
New Zealand male rowers
Rowers at the 1976 Summer Olympics
Olympic rowers of New Zealand
Rowers from Christchurch
Coxswains (rowing)
World Rowing Championships medalists for New Zealand
Companions of the New Zealand Order of Merit
University of Waterloo alumni
Academic staff of the Lincoln University (New Zealand)